Chunhyang is a Korean Pansori film directed by Im Kwon-taek, with a screenplay by Kang Hye-yeon and Kim Myung-gon. Distributed by CJ Entertainment, the film was released on January 29, 2000 in South Korea. Lee Hyo-jeong plays Chunhyang and Cho Seung-woo plays Mongryong.

It is a film adaptation of the pansori Chunhyangga, one of the most notable works in the pansori tradition. To date, there have been more than sixteen works based on this narrative, including three North Korean films. Im Kwon-taek's Chunhyang presents a new interpretation of this oral tradition with a focus towards a more global audience. It is the first Chunhyang adaptation that uses lyrics of pansori as a major part of the screenplay. The film uses the framing device of a present-day pansori narrator who, accompanied by a drummer, sings the story of Chunhyang in front of a responsive audience. The film flashes back and forth between the singer's presentation and scenes of Mongryong.

It was entered into the 2000 Cannes Film Festival. The film is the first Korean film which was presented at the 2000 Telluride Film Festival. At the 2000 Asia Pacific Film Festival, it won a Special Jury Award. It also won an award for Best Narrative at the Hawaii International Film Festival in 2000.

Plot
The film is told through pansori, a traditional Korean form of storytelling that seeks to narrate through song. It is based on Chunhyangga, a traditional Korean folktale and is set in 18th century Korea.

Lee Mongryong, a governor's son, falls in love and marries a beautiful girl Chunhyang Sung, the daughter of a courtesan. Their marriage is kept a secret from the governor who would immediately disown Lee if he found that his son married beneath him. The governor gets posted to Seoul and Mongryong is forced to leave his young wife behind, promising to come back for her when he passes the official exam.

After Mongryong leaves Namwon where Mongryong and Chunhyang first meets, new governor, Byun Hakdo, comes and wants Chunhyang for himself. When she refuses, stating that she already has a husband and will forever remain faithful to her beloved, the governor punishes her by flogging. Meanwhile, back in Seoul, Lee passes the test with the highest score and becomes an officer. Three years have passed and Lee Mongryong returns to the town on the King's mission. There, he finds out that his wife is to be beaten to death on the governor's birthday as a punishment for disobeying his lust. The governor, very corrupted and greedy, is arrested by Mongryong. The two lovers are finally united.

Cast
Lee Hyo-jeong - Chunhyang
Cho Seung-woo - Mongryong
Kim Sung-nyeo - Wolmae
Lee Jung-hun - Governor Byun
Kim Hak-yong - Bangja
Choi Jin-young - Governor Lee
Hong Kyung-yeun - kisaeng leader
Cho Sang-hyun - pansori singer
Kim Myung-hwan - pansori drummer
Lee Hae-ryong - Lord of Soonchun
Gok Jun-hwam - Lord of Okgwa
Yoon Keun-mo - Lord of Goksung
Lee Hye-eun - Hyangdan

Production
The bed scene between Chunhyang and Mongryong took two days to film because Cho Seung-woo and Hyo-jeong Lee, who had no experience at all, were shy. The two of them didn't know there was a love scene until they started filming, and they were scared, and director Im Kwon-taek gave them homework to come after seeing 'Yellow Hair'.

Critical reception
According to Elvis Mitchell of The New York Times, "Instead the story is freshened through the use of a Korean singing storyteller, a pansori singer, to provide a narration, belting out the song from a stage in front of an audience. The pansori, or song, is performed under a proscenium arch to highlight the ritual elements of folk tales. Even though much of what the pansori tells us unfolds before the cameras at the same moment, the forcefulness of the performance lends another layer of feeling to the picture."

Awards and nominations

References

External links 
 
 
 
 Chunhyang at the Busan International Film Festival
 The Ch'unhyang Story - from the award-winning website Instrok.org, created by East Rock Institute

2000 films
2000s romantic musical films
South Korean romantic musical films
Pansori
Films set in the 18th century
Films set in the Joseon dynasty
Films based on The Tale of Chunhyang
Films directed by Im Kwon-taek
2000s Korean-language films
South Korean historical romance films
Grand Prize Paeksang Arts Award (Film) winners
2000s South Korean films